Spoonville may refer to:
Spoonville, California, former name of Edgemont, Lassen County, California
Spoonville, Georgia
Spoonville, Michigan